Trunks may refer to:
Trunks (clothing), short swimsuits
Trunks (Dragon Ball), a character in Dragon Ball media
Trunks (album), by The Brothers Creeggan
A name for the trunk line operator requested in pre-subscriber trunk dialling telephone systems by a subscriber calling the local operator (British usage)

See also 
Trunk (disambiguation)